The Ján Francisci-Rimavský Gymnasium in Levoča, Slovakia, is a four-year high school with general classes and an eight-year college with a focus on foreign languages. Students are eligible to attend upon completion of the fifth grade of elementary school. The school is situated in the historic centre of Levoča.

History

1512 to 1918
The first high school in Levoča was founded in the 16th century. In 1513, local nobility funded the establishment of a Latin language school, and in 1520, with the help of Johanna Henckel, they acquired a gymnasium for the rector of the University of Kraków: Leonard Cox, an English humanist, scholar, and educator of King Henry VIII. Rector Jan Mylius established a study program in 1589, which was considered among the best of its era.

The original high school was Catholic. In 1544, a Lutheran high school was also established. From 1658 to 1664, the rector was Gaspar Hain, known as the author of Levoča's city chronicle. In 1696, the school changed from a Lutheran gymnasium to a Lutheran lyceum (seminary).

In 1672, Emperor Leopold I founded a Catholic gymnasium in Levoča. From 1746–47, Maximilian Hell was a professor at the gymnasium. He achieved such significant results that Empress Maria Theresa invited him to Vienna, and in 1768 authorized him to observe and calculate the distance between the Sun and the Earth.

In 1861, the gymnasium was Magyarized, but it continued to teach Slovak and German. After 1867, it only taught Hungarian and was converted into an eight-year Classic Royal Catholic gymnasium.

In 1903, the new director, Elek Kalmár, began to promote the construction of a new building. It was designed in the Art Nouveau style by architect Alfréd Hajós, and exterior construction was completed in November 1912. The old building was used until June 1913. The 1913–14 school year started in the new building.

1919 to present
In 1919, the school was placed under the Czechoslovak administration. The classical gymnasium was transformed into a practical school and renamed the Czechoslovak State Reál Gymnasium Dr. Vavra Šrobára. In 1937, it was renamed the State Slovak Reál Gymnasium in Levoča.

In 1948, the eight-year school was reorganized as a four-year school. In 1949, it incorporated the former high school and teachers college in Levoča and Spišské Podhradie. Its name changed several times between then and 1988, when it was renamed to honor Ján Francisci-Rimavský, an early Slovakian patriot.

School building 
The building, constructed in 1913 in the Art Nouveau style, is registered on the list of monuments of Slovakia. Because of the age of the building, various repairs have been necessary. The roofing and windows were recently replaced, and the façade and interior are being restored gradually. In addition to 16 classic classrooms, the building has specialized classrooms for chemistry, physics, and biology, two classrooms for foreign languages, and two classrooms for informatics.

The 100-seat school auditorium is used for cultural events and meetings. There is a sports hall close to the school. The campus also includes a playground for handball, basketball, long jump, and high jump.

Curriculum 
The school provides upper secondary education. Study is completed with a standard exit examination and receipt of an upper secondary school leaving certificate.

In the lower grades, education is governed by the state program for lower secondary education, ISCED 2; in higher grades, it is governed by the program for upper secondary education, ISCED 3A.

Students who have completed upper secondary education are eligible to continue with tertiary education at ISCED 5, or with various forms of post-secondary studies at ISCED 4.

Well-known graduates 
 Jan Brewer — printer
 Daniel Sinapius-Horčička — writer, translator
 Maximilian Hell — professor, 1745–48; physicist and astronomer; director of the observatory in Vienna
 Károly Markó the Elder — painter and landscape designer with works in Budapest, Bratislava, Copenhagen, Dresden, Florence, Košice, Leipzig, Munich, Prague, and Vienna
 Martin Liedemann — professor, rector
 Béla Kéler — composer, conductor
 Albert Fuchs — Slovak physicist, native of Levoča
 John Chalupka — novelist, playwright
 Self Vozár — poet, journalist, translator
 Ján Botto — poet, representative of literary Romanticism
 Pavol Dobšinský — priest, folklorist, writer
 Janko Kráľ — poet
 Ján Kalinčiak — poet, writer
 Janko Matúška — poet, novelist, playwright
 Bohuslav Nosák — poet, novelist, journalist, editor of Slovak national newspapers
 Louis Kuban — poet, novelist, playwright
 Nicholas Dohnány — poet, historian
 Peter Kellner-Hostinský — writer, journalist, historian, philosopher
 Self Bohdan Hroboň — poet, writer, translator
 Ján Francisci-Rimavský — poet, novelist, journalist, politician, briefly deputy professor of the Department of Language and Literature in Levoča
 Peter Michal Bohúň — teacher, painter
 Joseph Petzval — mathematician, physicist, inventor, founder of modern optics and photography
 Otto Petzval — mathematician, dean of the University of Budapest, member of the Hungarian Academy of Sciences
 Nicholas Stephen Ferienčík — writer, journalist, publicist
 Ján Levoslav Bella — composer
 Ivan Branislav Zoch — teacher, physical education pioneer, founder of Sokol; introduced school trips
 Ladislav Nádaši-Jégé — writer, editor
 Albert Škarvan — physician, writer, translator
 Aurel Stodola — physicist, engineer, theorist of steam and gas turbines, professor at the College of Technology in Zurich
 Andrej Hlinka — priest, politician
 Vavro Šrobár — politician
 Imrich Weiner King — painter, printmaker
 John Šmok — photographer, professor at FAMU in Prague; led the Department of Cinematography and Photography
 John Olejnik — ethnographer
 Simon Ondruš — writer, linguist, literary scholar; worked at Charles University and the University of Cologne
 Ladislav Dvonč — linguist
 Edmund Hleba — professor of the history of Slovak literature at FF Prešov
 Peter Milčák — translator, poet, educator
 Marian Milčák — translator, poet, educator
 Luke Pardubský — journalist
 Vincent Lafko — dean of the Faculty of Education, Olympic silver medalist in handball
 Tibor Búza — director of program services at STV
 Marek Michlík — mBank spokesperson
 Lucia Gažiová — actress

References
Gymnázium Janka Francisciho-Rimavského Levoča, Z dejín stredného školstva v Levoči

External links
 School Website

Art Nouveau architecture in Slovakia
Art Nouveau educational buildings
Gymnasiums in Slovakia
Schools in Slovakia
20th-century architecture in Slovakia